Xitang, formerly known as Xietang, Pingtang and Xutang, is a historic town in Jiashan County, Zhejiang, China. It borders Luxu Town in the north, Yaozhuang Town in the east, Ganyao Town in the southeast, and Tianning Town and Town in the west. Xitang is a water town crisscrossed by nine rivers. The town stretches across eight sections, linked by old-fashioned stone bridges. In the older parts of town, the buildings are set along the banks of the canals, which serve as the main transportation thoroughfares in the area.

History
Its history dates back to at least the Spring and Autumn period (770 BC–476 BC) when it was located at the border of the State of Yue and Wu. According to legend, Wu Zixu, a well-known scholar and military general, ordered to dig many canals and a pond to facilitate water transportation and to channel water to Jiashan County, and thus Xitang is also called "Xutang".

In 2001 it participated in the selection of World Heritage Site by the United Nations Educational, Scientific and Cultural Organization (UNESCO).

On October 8, 2003, it has been designated as a Historic Towns of China by the National Cultural Heritage Administration and Ministry of Housing and Urban-Rural Development.

In February 2017, it has been categorized as an AAAAA level tourist site by the China National Tourism Administration.

Administrative division
As of 2013, the town is divided into 4 communities 18 villages:  
 Chaonandi Community
 Tangdong Community
 Xijie Community
 Xiyuan Community 
 Cuinan
 Dashun
 Dizhao
 Didian
 Donghui
 Ganshang
 Hechi
 Hongling
 Hualian
 Jinming
 Limiao
 Qiandun
 Shendao
 Xiadianmiao
 Xinsheng
 Xingjian
 Yaque
 Zhonghu

Economy
The local economy is primarily based upon agriculture, tourism and local industry. Button production is the most famous in the area. It has 636 button production enterprises, producing more than 1600 kinds of buttons and about 60 billion buttons annually. It is known as "Hometown of Buttons in China".

Attractions
Xitang also contains numerous antique residences and temples, such as the Temple of the Seven Masters. The town keeps a tranquil ambience and scenic beauty, making it a very popular tourist attraction. It is frequently depicted in Chinese landscape painting.

The town houses many bridges, lanes and covered corridors, with many of the old streets and lanes retaining their original features. It is actually a street with roof. Some sections of the covered corridors are placed in the busiest section, while other are built along the river of streets. Long chairs are arranged along the riverside of some covered corridors for people to have a rest. Most of them are made of bricks and wood and covered by black tiles.

Shipi Lane
The most distinctive open-air lane is called "Shipi Lane". It got its name for the fact that it is flanked by two residential buildings. It was paved with 166 stone slabs.

Zui Garden
The Zui Garden is situated at Tawan Street of Xitang and traces its origins to the Ming dynasty (1368–1644). The garden, small and unique, includes a succession of five courtyards, in which delicate rockworks and winding aisles are ingeniously arranged. In the courtyard there is an exquisite tiny bridge made of bricks, which is ornamental and functional but allows only one person to pass through at a time. On the wall opposite the door are carved three Chinese characters "", from which the garden takes its name. The hall is built by Wang Zhixi, a prominent calligrapher and painter in the Qianlong period (1735–1795) of the Qing dynasty (1644–1911), whose works can still be seen in the garden.

Film and television
Xitang locations were featured in the final sequences of the motion picture Mission: Impossible III.

Transportation
The town is connected to two highways: G60 Shanghai-Hangzhou Expressway and S32 Shenjiahu Expressway.

The National Highways G320 and G318 pass across the town.

Gallery

References

Bibliography

External links
Xitang Official Website

Traditional folk houses in China
Ancient Chinese cities
AAAA-rated tourist attractions